Direct democracy or pure democracy is a form of democracy in which people decide on policy initiatives directly

It may also refer to:

Political parties
Alliance for Direct Democracy in Europe, abbreviated to ADDE, a European political party
Direct Democracy Ireland, a minor political party in Ireland
Direct Democracy (Poland), in Polish Demokracja Bezpośrednia, a Polish political party
Direct Democracy League, American political movement by John Randolph Haynes
Direct Democracy Now!, also known as True Democracy Now!, a Greek citizen grassroot organization made up of ordinary citizens
Direkte Demokratie für Europa (Direct Democracy for Europe), DDfE, a German campaign group led by the former Pegida treasurer, Kathrin Oertel
Europe of Freedom and Direct Democracy (EFDD or EFD2), a populist Eurosceptic political group in the European Parliament
Freedom and Direct Democracy, a hard Eurosceptic, anti-immigration and pro-direct democracy political party in the Czech Republic
Online Direct Democracy (abbr. ODD), formerly Senator Online, a registered Australian political party
None of the Above Direct Democracy Party, a minor political party in the province of Ontario, Canada